Hogu's Love is a 2015 South Korean television series based on the Daum webtoon of the same title by Yoo Hyun-sook. Starring Choi Woo-shik, Uee, Lim Seulong, and Lee Soo-kyung, it aired on tvN from February 9 to March 31, 2015 on Mondays and Tuesdays at 23:00 (KST) time slot for 16 episodes.

Synopsis
A young girl of South korea at the age of twenty one also participating in this competition at the position of first. Her name is Do-do-hee. At first position is only a position , not the position of first rank or the rank of gold medal. Before competition she was not looking well,not for the competition of win or lose, but because of ache in her stomach. 

The competition starts from 7:30 pm. Everyone chasing every other player in the competition. The game is on the end point, Do-hui (Do-do-hee's nick name) is not feeling well because of stomach ache. She is going to win because she is near the point of end or final line. And then she lose game with a lot of vomiting. She stands for second position or for silver medal. So, she is full of anger as she wants gold medal for her country. she is not satisfied with it. Her coach try to keep her anger silent. She left stadium within one half hour with lot of scolding with coach. In the way, in full of anger she message her coach to come at practice stadium for practicing swimming for one day. She is so upset no one help her in this.

Here, this is the beautiful evening for a young boy at the age of twenty two. His name is Ho-Go. Ho-gu He has never had a proper girlfriend, with girls constantly taking advantage of his sweet, naive nature by enjoying all the perks of dating then friend zone-ing him. His relationship-savvy twin sister Kang Ho-kyung  mocks him and his best friends Kim Tae-hee  and Shin Chung-jae for being sorely lacking in any dating skills.

Do Do-hee  is an athlete on the Korean national swimming squad, and won the silver medal at the recent Asian Games. Driven and competitive, she's frustrated at never getting first place and is known for cursing a lot.

The timid, bullied Ho-gu had a crush on Do-hee in their teens, when her beauty and sports cred made her the most popular girl in high school. She's the only reason he goes to their high school reunion, and when they meet again, he's surprised to learn that she remembers him. Ho-gu grabs the chance to spend time with the girl of his dreams, not knowing that Do-hee has a secret, that she is pregnant. Do-hee wants to bury this secret because if the story breaks out about her being pregnant, then her life would be destroyed.

Cast

Main
 Choi Woo-shik as Kang Ho-gu
 Uee as Do Do-hee
 Lim Seul-ong as Byun Kang-chul
 Lee Soo-kyung as Kang Ho-kyung

People around Do Do-hee
 Choi Deok-moon as So Shi-min

People around Kang Ho-gu
 Jung Won-joong as Kang Yong-moo
 Park Soon-chun as Kim Ok-ryung
 Choi Jae-hwan as Kim Tae-hee
 Lee Si-eon as Shin Chung-jae

People around Byun Kang-chul
 Oh Young-shil as Mok Kyung-jin
 Park Ji-il as Byun Kang-se
 Song Ji-in as In Gong-mi

Others
 Kim Hyun-joon as Noh Kyung-woo
 Seol A as Ji-yoon
 Ha Ji-young as Reporter
 Han Geun-sub
 Oh Hee-joong
 Lee Jin-kwon as Man running away with comic books	
 Won Woong-jae
 Ahn Soo-ho
 Shin Young-il as Announcer
 Noh Min-sang
 Kwon Byung-gil
 Lee Yoon-sang
 Jang Tae-min
 Kim Hye-hwa
 Han Yeo-wool
 Moon Jae-young as Director Yang
 Lee Joo-woo as Min-ji
 Lee Do-yeon as Han Sung-sil

Special appearances
 Lee Sung-min as Oh Sang-sik, customer of manhwa rental shop (ep. 1)
 Jang Young-nam as Pickpocket mom (ep. 2, 6)
 Min Do-hee as High school girl in Yeosu (ep. 2) 
 Kang Jun as High school boy in Yeosu (ep. 2)

Production
Director Pyo Min-soo and screenwriter Yoon Nan-joong previously worked together on the tvN series, Flower Boy Ramen Shop in 2011.

Hogu's Love original author Yoo Hyun-sook also wrote the webtoon I Steal Peeks at Him Every Day, which was adapted into another tvN series Flower Boys Next Door in 2013.

Ratings
In this table,  represent the lowest ratings and  represent the highest ratings.

References

External links
 Hogu's Love official tvN website 
 
 
 Hogu's Love webtoon at Daum 

2015 South Korean television series debuts
2015 South Korean television series endings
TVN (South Korean TV channel) television dramas
South Korean romantic comedy television series
Television shows based on South Korean webtoons